The Juno Awards of 1990, representing Canadian music industry achievements of the previous year, were awarded on 18 March 1990 in Toronto at a ceremony in the O'Keefe Centre. Rick Moranis was the host for the ceremonies, which were broadcast on CBC Television.

Alannah Myles won in three Juno categories on the strength of her internationally successful debut album.

Specialty television service YTV would broadcast a repeat of the televised awards ceremony one week later, according to a five-year agreement announced before the 1990 Juno Awards.

Nominees and winners

Canadian Entertainer of the Year
This award was chosen by a national poll rather than by Juno organisers CARAS.

Winner: The Jeff Healey Band

Other Nominees:
 Blue Rodeo
 Tom Cochrane
 k.d. lang
 Kim Mitchell

Best Female Vocalist
Winner: Rita MacNeil

Other Nominees:
 Lee Aaron
 Sass Jordan
 Anne Murray
 Candy Pennella

Best Male Vocalist
Winner: Kim Mitchell

Other Nominees:
 Bruce Cockburn
 George Fox
 David Wilcox
 Neil Young

Most Promising Female Vocalist
Winner: Alannah Myles

Other Nominees:
 Annette Ducharme
 Mitsou
 Mary Margaret O'Hara
 Anita Perras

Most Promising Male Vocalist
Winner: Daniel Lanois

Other Nominees:
 Neil James Harnett
 Ray Lyell
 Roch Voisine
 Rufus Wainwright

Group of the Year
Winner: Blue Rodeo

Other Nominees:
 Tom Cochrane and Red Rider
 Cowboy Junkies
 The Jeff Healey Band
 Rush

Most Promising Group
Winner: The Tragically Hip

Other Nominees:
 Brighton Rock
 Indio
 Paradox
 Sons of Freedom

Best Composer
Winner: David Tyson and Christopher Ward (for Alannah Myles)

Other Nominees:
 Greg Keelor and Jim Cuddy
 Luba
 Eddie Schwartz
 Jim Vallance

Best Country Female Vocalist
Winner: k.d. lang

Other Nominees:
 Carroll Baker
 Rita MacNeil
 Anne Murray
 Lori Yates

Best Country Male Vocalist
Winner: George Fox

Other Nominees:
 Gary Fjellgaard
 Handsome Ned
 Ian Tyson
 Jesse Winchester

Best Country Group or Duo
Winner: The Family Brown

Other Nominees:
 Alibi
 Great Western Orchestra
 Silver and Degazio
 Stoker Brothers

Best Instrumental Artist
Winner: Manteca

Other Nominees:
 Liona Boyd
 Canadian Brass
 Frank Mills
 Tafelmusik Baroque Chamber Orchestra

International Entertainer of the Year
Winner: Melissa Etheridge

Other Nominees:
 Crowded House
 Steve Earle
 Rod Stewart
 Randy Travis

Best Producer
Winner: Bruce Fairbairn, Pump by Aerosmith

Other Nominees:
 Daniel Lanois, Acadie by Daniel Lanois
 Bob Rock, Dr. Feelgood by Mötley Crüe & Blue Murder by Blue Murder
 Neil Peart, Geddy Lee and Alex Lifeson (with Co-producer Rupert Hine), "Force Ten" from Hold Your Fire & "Presto" from Presto by Rush
 David Tyson, Alannah Myles by Alannah Myles

Best Recording Engineer
Winner: Kevin Doyle, Alannah Myles by Alannah Myles

Other Nominees:
 Jean Claude Beaudoin, Tell Somebody by Sass Jordan
 Lenny DeRose, Bodyrock by Lee Aaron & she by Dalbello
 John Naslen, Big Circumstance by Bruce Cockburn
 Rick Starks, Perfect Foot by Manteca
 Michael Phillip Wojewoda, As the Crow Flies by Chalk Circle

Hall of Fame Award
Winner: Maureen Forrester

Walt Grealis Special Achievement Award
Winner: Rush

Nominated and winning albums

Album of the Year
Winner: Alannah Myles, Alannah Myles

Other Nominees:
 Now the Bells Ring, Rita MacNeil
 Rita, Rita MacNeil
 See the Light, The Jeff Healey Band
 Victory Day, Tom Cochrane and Red Rider

Best Children's Album
Winner: Beethoven Lives Upstairs, Susan Hammond and Barbara Nichol

Other Nominees:
 The Boy Who Wanted to Talk to Whales, Robert Minden Ensemble
 Footeprints, Norman Foote
 Improvise with Eric Nagler, Eric Nagler
 The People on My Street, Bob King

Best Classical Album (Solo or Chamber Ensemble)
Winner: 20th Century Original Piano Transcriptions, Louis Lortie

Other Nominees:
 Beethoven: The Complete Quartets, The Orford String Quartet
 Corelli: Concerti Grossi, Tafelmusik Baroque Orchestra
 Gabrieli and Monteverdi: Antiphonal Music, Canadian Brass
 Kevin McMillan, baritone Kevin McMillan

Best Classical Album (Large Ensemble)
Winner: Boccherini: Cello Concertos and Symphonies, Tafelmusik Baroque Orchestra

Other Nominees:
 Fete a la Francais, Montreal Symphony Orchestra, conductor Charles Dutoit
 Gershwin: Rhapsody in Blue, An American in Paris, Montreal Symphony Orchestra, conductor Charles Dutoit, piano Louis Lortie
 Haydn Symphonies No. 1 and 5, National Arts Centre Orchestra, conductor Gabriel Chmura
 Prokofiev: Symphonies Nos. 1 and 5, Montreal Symphony Orchestra, conductor Charles Dutoit

Best Album Design
Winner: Hugh Syme, Presto by Rush

Other Nominees:
 Jamie Bennett and Nuala Byles, Perfect Foot by Manteca
 Robert LeBeuf and J.W. Stewart, The Adventures of Women & Men Without Hate in the 21st Century by Men Without Hats
 Mary Margaret O'Hara, Miss America by Mary Margaret O'Hara
 Hugh Syme, Rockland by Kim Mitchell

International Album of the Year
Winner: Girl You Know It's True, Milli Vanilli (disqualified)

Other Nominees:
 Forever Your Girl, Paula Abdul
 The Raw & the Cooked, Fine Young Cannibals
 Hangin' Tough, New Kids on the Block
 Traveling Wilburys Vol. 1, Traveling Wilburys

Best Jazz Album
Winner: Skydance, Jon Ballantyne Trio featuring Joe Henderson

Other Nominees:
 Friday the 14th, Bernie Senesky
 Off Centre, Time Warp
 Pas de Probleme, The Hugh Fraser Quintet
 Something's Here, The Edmonton Jazz Ensemble

Best Roots & Traditional Album
Winner: Je Voudrais Changer D'Chapeau, La Bottine Souriante

Other Nominees:
 Humor Me, Jesse Winchester
 I Make My Home in Shoes, Amos Garrett
 Jubilation II, Montreal Jubilation Gospel Choir
 You Were on My Mind, Sylvia Tyson

Nominated and winning releases

Single of the Year
Winner: "Black Velvet", Alannah Myles

Other Nominees:
 "All the Things I Wasn't", The Grapes of Wrath
 "Love Is", Alannah Myles
 "Rock n Roll Duty", Kim Mitchell
 "Under Your Spell", Candi

Best Classical Composition
Winner: Concerto For Harp and Chamber Orchestra, Oskar Morawetz

Other Nominees:
 Introduction and Three Folk Songs, Jean Coulthard
 Sonata No. 1, Pat Carrabré
 The Sons of Jacob, Sid Robinovitch
 Third Chamber Concerto, Gary Kulesha

International Single of the Year
Winner: "Swing The Mood", Jive Bunny and the Mastermixers

Other Nominees:
 "Hangin' Tough", New Kids on the Block
 "Like a Prayer", Madonna
 "She Drives Me Crazy", Fine Young Cannibals
 "Straight Up", Paula Abdul

Best R&B/Soul Recording
Winner: Spellbound, Billy Newton-Davis

Other Nominees:
 Your Love, George Banton
 Mega Love, Debbie Johnson
 Another Love in Your Life, Jay W. McGee
 Never Be Lonely, Lorraine Scott

Best Reggae/Calypso Recording
Winner: Too Late To Turn Back Now, Sattalites

Other Nominees:
 Chuckie Prophesy, Clifton Joseph
 Soca Band, Elsworth James
 South Africa is a Disgrace, Leroy Sibbles
 Tribute to Ben Johnson, Elsworth James

Best Dance Recording
Winner: "I Beg Your Pardon (I Never Promised You a Rose Garden)", Kon Kan

Other Nominees:
 "Yada Yada", Jam Jam Jam
 "Let Your Backbone Slide", Maestro Fresh-Wes
 "Missing You", Candi
 "Under Your Spell", Candi

Best Video
Winner: Cosimo Cavallaro, "Boomtown" by Andrew Cash

Other Nominees:
 Don Allan, "Watcha Do to My Body" by Lee Aaron
 Chris Hooper, Kevin Kane, Robert Longevall, "All the Things I Wasn't" by The Grapes of Wrath
 Greg Masuak, "Giving Away a Miracle" by Luba
 Kari Skogland, "Waterline" by Spoons

References

External links
Juno Awards site

1990
1990 music awards
1990 in Canadian music